The 1989 Formula Shell Zoom Masters season was the 5th season of the franchise in the Philippine Basketball Association (PBA).

Transactions

Awards
Benjie Paras makes history by becoming the first PBA player to win both Rookie of the year (ROY) honors and the Most Valuable Player (MVP) trophy.
Bobby Parks won his third Best Import Award during the PBA Open Conference.

Notable dates
March 7: Rookie and number one draft pick Benjie Paras made up for uninspiring debut in their losing cause to San Miguel in the opener by scoring 23 points and team up with Bobby Parks, who poured in 61 points to give the Zoom Masters their first win of the season, routing an off-form Purefoods Hotdogs, 142-110. 

March 14: Bobby Parks scored 58 points as Formula Shell beats Alaska, which absorbed its fourth setback, 168-157 in overtime, for their second win in four games. 

May 4: Formula Shell arranged a finals rematch with San Miguel in the Open Conference by beating the Beermen, 148-125, and ended the hopes of Presto Ice Cream, which lost to Alaska two days before, to gain at least a tie for a playoff.  

June 22: The Zoom Masters scored their first win in two outings in the All-Filipino Conference, routing the Philippine national team, 151-124.  

July 11: Rookie Romeo dela Rosa fired 39 points to lead the Zoom Masters to a 124-122 win over Añejo Rum and improved their standings to four wins and three losses.

August 10: Coming off four straight losses in the semifinals and already out of the finals contention, the Zoom Masters upsets Purefoods Hotdogs, 113-106. Rookie Romeo dela Rosa scored his personal-best 40 points.   

August 15: Rookie Benjie Paras banged in a conference-high 44 points and fellow rookie Romeo dela Rosa added 34 points as Shell defeats Alaska, 136-129, and finish the semifinal round of the All-Filipino Conference with a 10-9 won-loss slate, winning their last three games. 

October 1: Import Steve Burtt scored 43 points while Benjie Paras added 39 points and grabbed 22 rebounds as Formula Shell beats Alaska, 128-117, for their first win at the start of the Reinforced Conference. 

October 26: Formula Shell defeated San Miguel, 136-123, as they finally snapped out of a seven-game losing streak after an opening day win. The victory was the Zoom Masters' second in nine games as rookie Benjie Paras scored a conference-high 50 points, duplicating his earlier 50-point output in the first conference.

Roster

Trades

Additions

Subtractions
{| cellspacing="0"
| valign="top" |

Imports

References

Shell Turbo Chargers seasons
Formula